Reza Mahalleh (also Romanized as Reẕā Maḩalleh) is a village in Reza Mahalleh Rural District, in the Central District of Rudsar County, Gilan Province, Iran. At the 2006 census, its population was 491, in 142 families.

References 

Populated places in Rudsar County